The European Dairy Association (EDA) is a representative of the milk processing industry in the European Union. The EDA's headquarters are located in Schuman, Brussels. The legal status of EDA under Belgian law is AISBL.

History
The association was founded in 1995 by a merger of different dairy associations with ASSILEC, the predecessor organisation of the EDA. Its founding members were the national dairy associations of ASSILEC. Since its foundation, the development of the EDA has followed the further enlargement of the European Union and the deepening of EU policies. Today, the membership of the EDA has 22 national associations.

Action
The EDA voices the priorities of the milk processing industry on an EU level. On behalf of and in close cooperation with its members (national dairy associations), the association acts and interacts with international and EU institutions, non-governmental organisations, the international media and other relevant stakeholders (Codex Alimentarius, WTO).

Presidents

Membership
The membership of the European Dairy Association (EDA) is composed of the national dairy associations representing the national dairy processors (private companies and cooperatives).

 Austria: Vereinigung Osterreichischer Milchverarbeiter (VÖM)
 Belgium: Confédération belge de l'industrie laitière (CBL)
 Germany: Milchindustrie-Verband (MIV)
 France: Association de la production laitière (ATLA)
 Czech Republic: Czech Moravian
 Denmark: Mejeriforeningen
 Estonia: Eesti Piimaliit
 Finland: Finnish Milk Processors and Dairy
 Greece: SEVGAP (Hellenic Association of Milk and Dairy Products Industry)
 Ireland: Irish Dairy Industries Association (IDIA)
 Italy: ASSOLATTE
 Luxembourg: Association laitière Luxembourgeoise (A.L.L)
 Netherlands: Nederlandse Zuivel Organisatie (NZO)
 Poland: Zwiazek Polskich Przetworcow Mlka (ZPPM)
 Portugal: Federaçao Nacional das Cooperativas de Productores de Leite (FENALAC)
 Slovenia: Slovene Dairy association
 Spain: Federacion National de Industrias Lacteas (FENIL)
 Sweden: Federacion of Swedish Farmers

The EDA is a member of the EU umbrella organisation FoodDrinkEurope.

External links
 Official website
 European Commission's Milk Market Observatory

References

1995 establishments in Europe
Dairy organizations
Organisations based in Brussels
Agricultural organisations based in Belgium
Organizations established in 1995